M. Naser Rahman is a Bangladesh Nationalist Party (BNP) politician and a former Jatiya Sangsad member representing the Moulvibazar-3 constituency.

Career
Rahman was elected member of parliament from Moulvibazar-3 constituency in the by-election held on 12 November 2001 as a BNP candidate. The seat fell vacant after his father, Saifur Rahman, had left one of the two constituencies he won in the 2001 Bangladeshi general election.

Rahman is the chairman of Saifur Rahman Foundation.
Naser Rahman is also the President of Moulvibazar District BNP.

Charges and convictions
In May 2007, the Anti-Corruption Commission filed a case against Rahman. According to the charge, Rahman and his wife suppressed Tk 6.06 crore in a bank account. In April 2008, an anti-graft tribunal sentenced Rahman to 13 years in prison for concealing wealth information and amassing assets beyond known sources of income.

Personal life
Rahman's father was Saifur Rahman, a former finance minister of Bangladesh. He married Regina Nasser (née Rahman) together they have two daughters and one son.

References

Living people
People from Moulvibazar Sadar Upazila
Bangladesh Nationalist Party politicians
8th Jatiya Sangsad members
Year of birth missing (living people)
Place of birth missing (living people)